Uruk Sport Club, is an Iraqi football team based in Al-Muthanna, that plays in the Iraq Division Two.

Managerial history
 Mohammed Zuhair

See also 
 2020–21 Iraq FA Cup

References

External links
 Uruk SC on Goalzz.com
 Iraq Clubs- Foundation Dates

Football clubs in Muthanna